Paramordellana ruficauda is a species of beetle in the genus Paramordellana. It was described in 1875.

References

Mordellidae
Beetles described in 1875